Year 132 (CXXXII) was a leap year starting on Monday (link will display the full calendar) of the Julian calendar. At the time, it was known as the Year of the Consulship of Serius and Sergianus (or, less frequently, year 885 Ab urbe condita). The denomination 132 for this year has been used since the early medieval period, when the Anno Domini calendar era became the prevalent method in Europe for naming years.

Events 
 By place 
 Roman Empire 
 The Temple of Olympian Zeus (Athens) is completed, using Cossutius' design.
 Bar Kokhba revolt: The messianic, charismatic Jewish leader Simon bar Kokhba starts a war of liberation for Judea against the Romans, which is eventually crushed (in 135) by Emperor Hadrian; Rabbi Akiva is supportive of the rebellion.
 Legio X Fretensis must evacuate Jerusalem, returning to Caesarea. The Jews enter the city, and re-establish their system of sacrifices. They strike coins to celebrate their independence, which will last for only 30 months. Legio XXII Deiotariana, which advanced from Egypt, is completely destroyed. 
 Merchants in Britain build structures outside the forts of Hadrian's Wall, and offer goods and services (including brothels) to Roman soldiers, who receive salaries in a region that otherwise has virtually no ready money.
 Construction begins on the Mausoleum of Hadrian in Rome (known today as Castel Sant'Angelo).

 Asia 
 Change of era name from Yongjian (7th year) to Yangjia of the Chinese Han Dynasty.

 By topic 
 Art and Science 
 Chinese scientist Zhang Heng invents the first seismometer for determining the exact cardinal direction of earthquakes hundreds of miles away; the device employs a series of complex gears around a central swinging pendulum.

Births 
 Cai Yong, Chinese calligrapher and musician (d. 192)
 Han Huandi, emperor of the Han Dynasty (d. 168)
 Tao Qian, Chinese official and warlord (d. 194)

Deaths 
 Juvenal of Benevento, Roman Christian and saint
 Sun Cheng, Chinese eunuch and politician

References